Arthur Bailly-Blanchard (October 1, 1855 - August 25, 1925) sometimes written Arthur Bailey-Blanchard was an American diplomat. He was the American ambassador to Haiti from 1914 to 1921.

Biography
He was born on October 1, 1855, in New Orleans, Louisiana, to T. Bailly-Blanchard Jr. and Jeanne Eliza Field.

In 1900 he was appointed the third secretary at the embassy in Paris, France.  He was the American ambassador to Haiti from 1914 to 1921.  He was ambassador during turbulent times in the history of Haiti, arriving there on a US battleship.

He died on August 25, 1925, at the Mount Royal Hotel in Montreal.

References

1855 births
1925 deaths
People from New Orleans
Ambassadors of the United States to Haiti
20th-century American diplomats